SCNT may refer to:

 Somatic cell nuclear transfer
 Suez Canal Net Ton, a unique unit of measurement representing the revenue-earning capacity of a vessel